The Gribovsky G-23 Komsomolyets 2 was a two-seat, single aircraft originally intended to explore the potential of a car-derived, water cooled inline engine for light aviation. It was built in the USSR in the 1930s. A second example was fitted with two different engines of greater power.

Design and development
The Komsomolyets took its name from that of the Young Communists youth organisation Komsomol. It was designed to test the suitability of the GAZ-M-60 engine for light aircraft use.  The M-60 was developed from the Ford derived engine used in the GAZ-M1 motor-car and was a  water-cooled, upright four cylinder unit and as a result the G-23 had a radiator protruding beneath its nose and a low set propeller.

Apart from its nose and its extra tandem seat, the G-23 had much in common with the single seat Gribovsky G-22.  Both were low wing cantilever monoplanes with flat sided fuselages and long dorsal headrest fairings.  They also shared similar elliptical vertical tails and fixed tail skid undercarriages, with each main wheel on a single leg and enclosed in a fairing. However, the G-23 was significantly larger, with a 25% greater span and 50% more wing area.  The extra seat meant it was also longer.

The G-23 was completed in February 1937 and made its first flight soon after. It took 19 minutes to reach  and about 40 minutes more to double that altitude. With two seats and standard fuel capacity, the G-23 had a range of  but for this flight it was configured as a single-seater, with the forward cockpit replaced by extra tankage and faired over.

It flew in 1938 and was designated the G-23bis. The new engine improved the climb rate by a factor of about twelve, the ceiling by a factor over 3 and the maximum speed by 20%. Late in 1938 this airframe was re-engined with a   GAZ-11, becoming known as the G-23bis-GAZ.

Variants
G-23 Flown in 1937, powered by GAZ-M-60 water-cooled 4-cylinder inline engine.
G-23bis Flown in 1938, powered by a M-11Ye five-cylinder radial engine.
G-23bis-GAZ Flown in late 1938, powered by GAZ-11 engine.

Specifications (Gribovsky G-23bis)

References

1930s Soviet sport aircraft
G-23
Low-wing aircraft
Aircraft first flown in 1937